Elachista picroleuca is a moth in the family Elachistidae. It was described by Edward Meyrick in 1921. It is found on Java.

The wingspan is about 8 mm. The forewings are purplish-grey, irrorated with blackish, more strongly blackish towards the margins of an oblique-triangular white spot on the costa at three-fourths. The hindwings are dark grey.

References

Moths described in 1921
picroleuca
Moths of Asia